Mocis alterna, the bean looper, is a species of moth of the family Erebidae first described by Francis Walker in 1858. It is found in the Australian state of Queensland.

The larvae feed on Phaseolus, Medicago sativa and Glycine max.

References

External links

Moths of New Zealand
Moths described in 1858
alterna